Ching Kuo Institute of Management and Health (CKIMH) is a private college in Zhongshan District, Keelung City, Taiwan. It was later renamed in 2000 to reflect its focus on management and health-related programs.

CKIMH offers a wide range of undergraduate and graduate programs, including those in business administration, accounting, nursing, health care management, and traditional Chinese medicine.

History
The university was originally established as Deh-Yu College of Nursing and Management in 1957. In 2002, it was upgraded to Deh-Yu Institute and subsequently Ching Kuo Institute of Management and Health.

Faculty
 Department of Applied Cosmetic Science
 Department of Applied Information and Multimedia
 Department of Child Educare
 Department of Culinary Arts
 Department of Food and Health Science
 Department of Nursing
 Department of Hotel and Restaurant Management
 Department of Senior Citizen Service Management
 Department of Sports, Health and Leisure
 Department of Style Design and Fashion Performance

Transportation
The school is accessible North West from Keelung Station of the Taiwan Railways.

See also
 List of universities in Taiwan

References

External links
 

1957 establishments in Taiwan
Educational institutions established in 1957
Universities and colleges in Keelung